= Aarveld =

- Neighbourhood
- Aarveld in the municipality of Heerlen
- Coordinates: 50°52′54″N 5°58′46″E
- Country: Netherlands
- Municipality: Heerlen
- Province: Limburg

Population (2021)
  - Total: 1,180
- Postal code: 6419
- Area code: +(31)

Aarveld is a Dutch neighbourhood of Heerlen, in the province of Dutch Limburg. On 1 January 2021, Aarveld had 1,180 inhabitants.
